Peretz P. Friedmann is an American aerospace engineer, the François-Xavier Bagnoud Professor of Aerospace Engineering at the University of Michigan, and the editor-in-chief of the AIAA Journal.

References

1938 births
Living people
American aerospace engineers
University of Michigan faculty